

The grand pensionary was the most important Dutch official during the time of the Dutch Republic. In theory, a grand pensionary was merely a civil servant of the Estates of the dominant province, the County of Holland, among the Seven United Provinces. In practice, the grand pensionary of Holland was the political leader of the entire Dutch Republic when there was no stadtholder at the centre of power.

The position of the grand pensionary is not easily expressed in modern political terms but is sometimes compared to that of a prime minister. Fundamental differences are that a  had no fellow ministers and no head of state above him.

Etymology
Its Dutch name, can be literally translated as "councillor pensionary". A pensionary in general was a lawyer paid by a city council to advise them on a permanent basis. Because of the regular payments he was a pensionarius in mediaeval Latin. Such a person was called a stadsadvocaat in the Dutch language. The States of Holland and West-Friesland had a pensionary who was a council member, a raad, himself. He was, therefore, Raedt ende Pensionaris in seventeenth-century Dutch, which later was simplified to raadpensionaris or raadspensionaris. French diplomats referred to the raadpensionaris of Holland as the Grand-pensionnaire, to discern him from comparable officials in Dutch provinces of lesser importance. This embellishment was not used by the Dutch themselves. In English the French was translated as "Grand Pensionary". The Estates of the province of Zealand also had a raadpensionaris, which also could be referred to as a Grand Pensionary. The provinces of Groningen and Gelderland had a simple pensionaris. The provinces of Utrecht and Friesland had a landsadvocaat.

History 
The office started in 1619 and replaced the title of land's advocate. If the position of stadtholder of Holland was filled, then the grand pensionary was often the second leader of the Republic. Being the raadpensionaris of Holland, the grand pensionary acted as the chairman of States of Holland. He was appointed by the Estates but could also instantly be fired by the Estates. The city council of Dort, which was seen as the oldest city of Holland, had the right to nominate a new grand pensionary. When the grand pensionary was absent, he was temporarily replaced by the stadsadvocaat or pensionary of Dort.

Sessions of the Estates were ruled by a procedure that was very different from that of modern parliaments. No votes were held on some proposal and there was no round of debates. The grand pensionary controlled the agenda. He introduced a subject and then invited the members to state their opinions, which was done in a fixed order, reflecting the dates the cities they represented had been given city rights. At the end, the grand pensionary summarised each of the statements of the delegates, with an implicit conclusion about what collective decision had been made by this. This way, if he was a competent man, he could control the entire decision-making process, especially as one of his duties was to represent the ten members of the nobility delegates—the —in their absence and phrase the single opinion they as a body had the right to express. The office existed because all delegates of the States were, although ranked according to ancient feudal hierarchy, still basically equal and none among them could thus act as a head.

The grand pensionary also took care of the total correspondence of the Estates. He thus handled communications with lower administrative bodies, the other provinces of the Republic, the States General of the Netherlands, and foreign powers. This means his function combined elements of the duties performed by modern ministers of internal and foreign affairs. Letters to the Estates could be read by all the members. Therefore, messages of a more secretive nature were sent to the grand pensionary personally. Large parts of the correspondence of the various grand pensionaries have been preserved, forming an important source of information for later historians. The diplomatic contacts of the Republic were in principle managed by the States General. However, they were ill-equipped to receive and entertain envoys with the pomposity needed in the seventeenth century to avoid offending foreign rulers. In practice, this was delegated to the court of the stadtholder of Holland, who also resided at The Hague. When no stadtholder was appointed, the grand pensionary received envoys.

The Batavian Republic of 1795 first abolished the office but in the last year of the Batavian Commonwealth, 1805–1806, the title had to be reinstituted on orders of Napoleon as part of a number of measures to strengthen the executive power; Rutger Jan Schimmelpenninck thus functioned for a short time as the last grand pensionary. He officially functioned as a president of the entire Republic, not just of Holland. In June 1806, Carel de Vos van Steenwijk was for two weeks acting grand pensionary as part of a transitional arrangement.

The most famous and significant grand pensionary was Johan de Witt, who held the office between 1653 and 1672. Johan van Oldenbarnevelt, who played a crucial role in the Dutch struggle for independence equalled him in influence, though he held the position when it was still called land's advocate.

See also 
 List of Grand Pensionaries

References 
 
 
 

1619 establishments in the Dutch Republic
1806 disestablishments in the Batavian Republic
Titles of national or ethnic leadership